The mayor of St. Louis is the chief executive officer of St. Louis's city government.  The mayor has a duty to enforce city ordinances and the power to either approve or veto city ordinances passed by the Board of Aldermen. The current mayor is Tishaura Jones, who took office on April 20, 2021.

Forty-seven people have held the office, four of whom — William Carr Lane, John Fletcher Darby, John Wimer, and John How — served non-consecutive terms.  Lane, the city's first mayor, served the most terms: eight one-year terms plus the unexpired term of Darby. Francis Slay is the longest-serving mayor, having served four 4-year terms. The second-longest-serving mayor was Henry Kiel, who served 12 years and nine days over three terms in office. Two others — Raymond Tucker and Vincent C. Schoemehl — also served three terms, but seven fewer days. The shortest-serving mayor was Arthur Barret, who died 11 days after taking office. The first female mayor was Lyda Krewson, who served from 2017 to 2021.

Duties and powers
St. Louis was incorporated as a city on December 9, 1822, four months after Missouri was admitted as a state to the Union.  In accordance with its new charter, the city changed its governance to a mayor-council format and elected its first mayor, William Carr Lane, on April 7, 1823.

Elections
The mayor is elected for four years during the general municipal election, which is held every two years on the first Tuesday after the first Monday in April. (Party primary elections are held in March.) The mayor is usually sworn during the first session of the Board of Aldermen two weeks after the election.

Under the original city charter, the mayor was elected to a one-year term. Terms became two years under the 1859 city charter. The mayor's office was extended to its present four-year term after passage of the Charter and Scheme in 1876 which separated the City of St. Louis from St. Louis County.

The mayor is not term limited.

Succession
If the office of mayor becomes vacant through death, resignation, recall, or removal by the board of aldermen, the president of the board of aldermen becomes mayor until a special mayoral election can be held; if the office is only temporarily vacant due to disability of the mayor, the president only acts out the duties of mayor.  Should both offices be vacant, the vice-president of the board of aldermen becomes mayor.

Five people have acted as mayor: Wilson Primm following the resignation of John Darby; Ferdinand W. Cronenbold following the resignation of Chauncey Filley; Herman Rechtien following the death of Arthur Barret; George W. Allen following the resignation of David Francis; and Aloys P. Kaufmann following the death of William Becker.

List of mayors

Notes

 A.  47 people have served as mayor, four twice; the table includes these non-consecutive terms as well.
 B.  The fractional terms of some mayors are not to be understood absolutely literally; rather, they are meant to show single terms during which multiple mayors served, due to resignations, deaths and the like.
 C.  Samuel Merry was elected mayor of St. Louis in April 1833; however, his eligibility was questioned by the City Council as he was a federal officer—United States Receiver of Public Moneys in St. Louis.  Merry filed suit to force the council's compliance and in October 1833, he was ruled ineligible by the Missouri Supreme Court.  Johnston was elected mayor in a special mayoral election held a month later on November 9.  Page continued to serve as mayor until the case was settled and Johnston elected.
 D.  Darby resigned from office.  William Carr Lane was later elected to fill the vacancy.
 E.  As president of the Board of Aldermen, Primm acted as mayor following the resignation of Darby.
 F.  Oliver Filley's second term was the first mayoral term to last 2 years.
 G.  Daniel G. Taylor was the candidate of a one-time coalition of traditional Missouri Democrats, pro-slavery activists, and secessionists calling itself the "Union Anti-Black Republican" ticket. The coalition was suspicious of the Abolitionist platform of the Republican party, and argued that St. Louis should not be governed by "Black Abolitionists" who would support newly elected President Lincoln in acting, including the use of military force, to prevent secession of southern states. Mayor Taylor worked in concert with Governor Claiborne Fox Jackson, until Jackson fled the state capitol to establish a Confederate aligned state government-in-exile. Mayor Taylor then cooperated with the new conservative-Unionist Governor, Hamilton Gamble.
 H.  Chauncey Filley resigned after serving one year of his two-year term as mayor due to poor health.
 I.  As president of the Board of Common Council, Cronenbold acted as mayor following the resignation of Chauncey Filley.
 J.  Died in office.
 K.  Barret became suddenly ill and died after only 11 days in office.
 L.  As president of the City Council, Rechtin acted as mayor following the death of Arthur Barret.
 M.  Henry Overstolz was declared defeated by James Britton in the 1875 election, but contested the election and was seated as mayor nine months later after a recount of the ballots.
 N.  Per the new city charter of 1876, Overstolz became the first mayor of St. Louis elected to a four-year term.
 O.  Resigned from office to become Governor of Missouri.
 P.  As president of the City Council, Allen acted as mayor following the resignation of David Francis.
 Q.  As president of the Board of Aldermen, Kaufmann became mayor following the death of William Becker.  He was later elected mayor, in a special mayoral election in November 1944, to fill Becker's unexpired term.

References
General

 
 
 
 
 

Charters

 
 
 

Specific